
Edinburg may refer to the following places:

South Africa
 Edinburg, North West
 Edinburg, Mpumalanga

United States
 Edinburg, Illinois
 Edinburg, Iowa
 Edinburg, Maine
 Edinburg, Mississippi
 Edinburg, Missouri
 Edinburg, Scotland County, Missouri
 Edinburg, New Jersey
 Edinburg, New York
 Edinburg, North Dakota
 Edinburg, Ohio
 Edinburg, Pennsylvania
 Edinburg, Texas
 Edinburg, Virginia
 Edinburg Acres Colonia, Texas
 Edinburg Forest, Maryland
 Edinburg Park, New Jersey
 Edinburg Township, Portage County, Ohio

Elsewhere
 The German exonym for the town of Dzintari, Jelgavas Rajons, Latvia

See also
 Edenburg (disambiguation)
 Edinburgh (disambiguation)